The following is a discography of albums, EPs and singles released by the Australian band The Blackeyed Susans.

Studio albums

Live albums

Extended plays

Compilation albums

Singles

Notes

References

General
 
 
 
 
Specific

Blackeyed Susans, The
Rock music group discographies